Los Sueños Locos (English: Crazy Dreams) is the second studio album by Spanish rock band Fito & Fitipaldis. It was published by DRO in 2001.

Track listing

Chart performance

Certifications

References 

2001 albums
Fito & Fitipaldis albums
Spanish-language albums